Gyulli Chokheli (12 February 1935, Tbilisi, Georgian SSR) is a Soviet and Georgian jazz singer. Meritorious Artist of the Georgian SSR (1967).

Biography
Born 12 February 1935 in Tbilisi. Mother – Georgian People's Artist Yelena Chokheli.

She began to sing in her school years, studying in the music school at the Tbilisi State Conservatoire. Since 1953, the singer on the professional stage in the vocal trio of the Philharmonic.

In the late 50s she worked in the orchestras of Oleg Lundstrem, Konstantin Orbelyan, Yuri Saulsky. The basis of her repertoire was then songs of the peoples of the world. Since 1961, performs with solo concerts and big band running by Eddie Rosner. One of the leading Soviet jazz singers.

Winner of the first prize at the Sopot International Song Festival 1967.

References

External links
 გიული ჩოხელი — ქართველი ჯაზდივა
 Певцы советской эстрады
 Gyulli Chokheli at last.fm

1935 births
Living people
Musicians from Tbilisi
Soviet women singers
20th-century women singers from Georgia (country)
Jazz singers from Georgia (country)